Janaseva Vidya Kendra (JSVK), commonly known as Janaseva Vidya Kendra Boys Hostel, is located on Magadi Road, Channenahalli, in Bangalore in the Indian state of Karnataka. It is a boys' hostel school. The school was built by educationists from Karnataka and began with 13 boys in 1972, growing to around 600 students ranging from 5th to 12th grade. The school celebrated its 25th year in 2000.

The School celebrates its  Annual Day in December month every year.

The institution has started to construct a new building on campus. Bhoomi Pooja was performed on 30 April 2015. The chief guest was Sarasanghachalak Dr. Mohan Bhagavath. The work will be completed by 2020.

Management and facilities
JSVK is run by the Janaseva Trust. Most of the members are professors and educationist in Karnataka. The school covers over 60 acres. Facilities include an emergency medical care unit and barber shop. Sports facilities include courts for football, badminton, basketball, field hockey, volleyball, Kho kho and Kabaddi

All students live in dormitories and are supervised by house masters. Most daily activities are run by students under the supervision of house master or supervisors. The main house master or Pradhana Nilaya Palaka is Raju master.

The staff consists of:
 Nirmal Kumar - Director
 Sooryanarayana Rao - Co-ordinator
 Mahantesh.H.G  - Principal
 D.H Balakrishna

External links

References

High schools and secondary schools in Bangalore
Boys' schools in India
Private schools in Bangalore
Boarding schools in Karnataka